Verticordia capillaris is a flowering plant in the myrtle family, Myrtaceae and is endemic to the south-west of Western Australia. It is a shrub with a single stem at the base, small leaves and creamy white or occasionally pink flowers in dense corymb-like groups. It is common in small areas near Geraldton.

Description

Flowering time is from September to November.

Taxonomy and naming
Verticordia capillaris was first formally described by Alex George in 1991 and the description was published in Nuytsia from specimens collected in Kalbarri National Park by Alex George and Bob Wemm. The specific epithet (capillaris) is "named from the Latin capillaris (hair-like), in reference to the very slender style".

George placed this species in subgenus Verticordia, section Corymbiformis along with V. polytricha, V. densiflora, V. eriocephala and V. brownii.

Distribution and habitat
This verticordia grows in sand, sandy clay or sandy loam in tall shrubland in areas near the Kalbarri National Park and south to near Mullewa in the Avon Wheatbelt, Geraldton Sandplains and Yalgoo biogeographic regions.

Conservation
Verticordia capillaris  is classified as "Priority Four" by the Government of Western Australia Department of Parks and Wildlife, meaning that is rare or near threatened.

Use in horticulture
This species is very rare in cultivation although one plant which was originally transplanted from land that was later cleared for agriculture has survived for more than 15 years. Otherwise the species has proven difficult to introduce to horticulture.

References 

capillaris
Rosids of Western Australia
Eudicots of Western Australia
Plants described in 1991